The Elliott-Larsen Building is a state government office in downtown Lansing, Michigan, named after Democratic State Representative Daisy Elliott and Republican State Representative Melvin Larsen, primary sponsors of the Elliott-Larsen Civil Rights Act.  It was formerly known as the Lewis Cass Building, named after territorial governor Lewis Cass.  It is the Michigan state government's oldest standing office building. The building was added to the National Register of Historic Places as "State Office Building" in 1984.

History
The first state office building in Lansing was constructed in 1853; this was replaced with another building in 1872 and demolished the following year. By the 1910s, the state realized the need for a new office building, and funds were appropriated beginning in 1917 for a new structure. Architect Edwyn A. Bowd of Lansing was commissioned to design the building, and plans were approved in 1918. Construction commenced in 1919 on the Classical Revival style building, and was completed in 1921.

On February 8, 1951, the building was intentionally set on fire by a state office employee. The following morning, part of the seventh floor collapsed down to the next level, which destroyed a large number of state historical records. In the reconstruction, the seventh floor was removed.

The building served as the primary state office building until the completion of the first part of a new state government complex in 1953. The building remains in use by the state.

On June 30, 2020, Gov. Gretchen Whitmer announced the renaming of the building as the Elliott-Larsen Building in honor of lawmakers who sponsored Michigan's bipartisan civil rights law of 1976.

Description 
The Elliott-Larsen Building is a six-story (originally seven-story) U-shaped Classical Revival structure with a flat roof, with a facade of cream-colored sandstone above a granite basement. A cornice separates the second and third floors, forming a base for four-story pilasters with Tuscan capitals above. An entablature with cornice runs above the pilasters. As originally built, the building had three arched entrances. After the 1951 fire, two entrances were removed, and the main entrance completely rebuilt as a projecting gray granite entryway.

Government agencies
State of Michigan government agencies located in Elliot-Larsen Building:

Department of Technology, Management and Budget
Department of Health & Human Services
Department of Labor and Economic Opportunity

References

External links
http://skyscraperpage.com/gallery/showphoto.php?photo=54437
http://skyscraperpage.com/gallery/showphoto.php?photo=57550
http://skyscraperpage.com/gallery/showphoto.php?photo=61157
http://skyscraperpage.com/gallery/showphoto.php?photo=61971

Government buildings on the National Register of Historic Places in Michigan
Neoclassical architecture in Michigan
Buildings and structures completed in 1919
Buildings and structures in Lansing, Michigan
State government buildings in the United States
Government buildings in Michigan
National Register of Historic Places in Lansing, Michigan
Name changes due to the George Floyd protests